Śat ሰ is a letter of the Ge'ez abugida, descended from South Arabian 𐩪. It represents both a historical "s" /s/ (a voiceless alveolar fricative), like the s in sink and "ṯ" /θ/ (a voiceless dental fricative), like the th in think.

See also
Ḍäppa  ፀ
Śawt  ሠ
Proto-Semitic
Shin (letter)

Ge'ez language